Noboru Sugai  is a Japanese professional golfer.

Sugai was born in Tokyo, to Japanese father and a Russian mother. He turned professional in 1975 and has won three tournaments and over 275 million ¥ on the Japan Golf Tour.

In 2002, he became the first Japanese to win the Senior British Open in what was the last staging before the tournament became a Champions Tour major. He played on the European Seniors Tour in 2003 and 2004 with little success.

Professional wins (6)

Japan Golf Tour wins (3)

Japan Golf Tour playoff record (1–1)

Senior PGA Tour wins (1)

European Senior Tour wins (1)

Other senior wins (2)
2000 Fujita Kanko Open (Japan)
2001 Castle Hill Open (Japan)

Results in major championships

Note: Sugai only played in The Open Championship.

CUT = missed the half-way cut

Senior major championships

Wins (1)

Team appearances
Four Tours World Championship (representing Japan): 1990, 1991

External links

Japanese male golfers
Japan Golf Tour golfers
European Senior Tour golfers
Winners of senior major golf championships
Japanese people of Russian descent
Sportspeople from Tokyo
1949 births
Living people